The 1859 Connecticut gubernatorial election was held on April 4, 1859. It was a rematch of the 1858 Connecticut gubernatorial election. Incumbent governor and Republican nominee William Alfred Buckingham defeated former congressman and Democratic nominee James T. Pratt with 51.19% of the vote.

General election

Candidates
Major party candidates

William Alfred Buckingham, Republican
James T. Pratt, Democratic

Results

References

1859
Connecticut
1859 gubernatorial